Procometis acutipennis is a moth of the  family Autostichidae. It is known from the Gambia and Congo.

The wingspan of this species is about 26 mm. The forewings are pale cinereous, sparsely sprinkled with elongate fuscous scales, much shaded along the costal margin and on the dorsal margin about the obsolete anal angle with brown and greyish fuscous. There are two small fuscous spots, the first at about half the wing-length, slightly above the middle, the second on the same level beyond it, less than half-way to the apex. The hindwings are greyish cinereous.

References

Walsingham, Thomas de Grey 1891a. African Micro-Lepidoptera. - Transactions of the entomological Society of London 1891(1):63–132, pls. 3–7

Moths described in 1891
Procometis